The Edwin Scharff Prize has been awarded annually by the city of Hamburg since 1955, named after sculptor Edwin Scharff. The prize is awarded to artist who shaped the cultural life of Hamburg. The winners are chosen by a seven-member jury, which is appointed by the Senate. The prize money is €15,000.

List of recipients

 1955 Erich Hartmann and Hans Martin Ruwoldt
 1956 Arnold Fiedler and Fritz Husmann
 1957 Karl Kluth and Herbert Spangenberg
 1958 Fritz Kronenberg and Richard Steffen
 1959 Willem Grimm and Eylert Spars
 1960 Tom Hops and Martin Irwahn
 1961 Fritz Flinte and Karl August Ohrt
 1962 Ivo Hauptmann and Alfred Mahlau
 1963 Joachim Albrecht and Ursula Querner
 1964 Werner Reichold and Gustav Seitz
 1965 Horst Janssen and Paul Wunderlich
 1966 Fritz Fleer and Hans Sperschneider
 1967 Friedrich Ahlers-Hestermann
 1968 Gisela Bührmann and Diether Kressel
 1969 Volker Detlef Heydorn and Hans Kock
 1970 Werner Bunz and Harald Duwe
 1971 Knud Knabe and Jörn Pfab
 1972 Armin Sandig and Manfred Sihle-Wissel
 1973 Volker Meier and Hans Hermann Steffens
 1974 Almut Heise and Karin Witte
 1975 Edgar Augustin and Anna Oppermann
 1976 Ingrid Webendoerfer and Wilhelm M. Busch
 1977 Kai Sudeck
 1978 no recipient
 1979 Dieter Glasmacher
 1980 Detlef Birgfeld
 1981 Christa Lühtje and Holger Matthies
 1982 Klaus Kröger
 1983 Ulrich Rückriem
 1984 Claus Böhmler
 1985 Hanne Darboven
 1986 Gudrun Piper and Max Hermann Mahlmann
 1987 Jan Meyer Rogge
 1988 Gustav Kluge
 1989 Franz Erhard Walther
 1990 Stanley Brouwn
 1993 Jürgen Bordanowicz
 1994 Rolf Rose
 1995 Hyun-Sook Song
 1996 Anna and Bernhard Blume
 1997 Klaus Kumrow
 1998 Andreas Slominski
 1999 Gisela Bullacher
 2000 Nicola Torke
 2001 Bogomir Ecker
 2002 Wiebke Siem
 2003 Daniel Richter
 2004 Till Krause
 2005 Jochen Lempert
 2006 Michael Dörner
 2007 Anna Gudjónsdóttir
 2008 Jeanne Faust
 2009 Linda McCue
 2010 Frank Gerritz
 2011 Peter Piller
 2012 "Ort des Gegen e.V." in honor of Annette Wehrmann
 2013 Gunter Reski
 2014 Christoph Schäfer
 2015 Stefan Kern
 2016 Silke Grossmann
 2017 Thomas Baldischwyler
 2018 Michaela Melián
 2019 Alexander Rischer
 2020 Jochen Schmith
 2021 Nana Petzet

References

External links
 

German awards